The British Academy Television Award for Best Single Drama is one of the major categories of the British Academy Television Awards (BAFTAs), the primary awards ceremony of the British television industry. According to the BAFTA website, the category is for "a single, self-contained drama.", this "includes single films which form part of an anthology series, where each episode has a self-contained story. The same characters cannot appear in a later episode." It was awarded as Best Single Play from 1973 to 1983. Prior to that, there was a sole category for Drama Production.

Winners and nominees

1970s

1980s (as Best Single Play)

1980s

1990s

2000s

2010s

2020s

Note: The series that don't have recipients on the tables had Production team credited as recipients for the award or nomination.

References

External links
List of winners at the British Academy of Film and Television Arts

Single Drama